The 1957 New Zealand Grand Prix was a motor race held at the Ardmore Circuit on 13 January 1957. The event was won by Briton Reg Parnell driving the Ferrari 555/860 to victory over fellow Briton Peter Whitehead and former New Zealand Grand Prix winner, Stan Jones.

The event was perhaps best known for the death of British driver Ken Wharton. Whilst attempting to overtake a lapped car, Wharton lost control of his car and struck straw bales outlining the base of the pylon carrying an overhead banner over the circuit. After somersaulting several times, where Wharton was thrown out onto the circuit, he was left unconscious with severe head injuries of which he would later succumb to.

Classification

References

New Zealand Grand Prix
Grand Prix
January 1957 sports events in New Zealand